Ditrigona komarovi is a moth in the family Drepanidae. It was described by Alekseya Ivanovitch Kurentzov in 1935. It is found in Ussuri in the Russian Far East.

The wingspan is 20–21 mm. The forewings and hindwings are white, the forewings with light brown fasciae. The antemedial fascia is outwardly curved near the cell and the lunulate (crescent-shaped) postmedial fascia is curved proximally near the radial veins and terminates at the middle of the costa. There is one cell-spot and a transverse stroke anterior and proximal to this spot. The hindwings are as the forewings, but the antemedial fascia is almost straight and there usually is no transverse stroke in the cell.

References

Moths described in 1935
Drepaninae
Moths of Asia